Seosomun Church(서소문교회) is a church located in Seosomun-dong, Jung-gu, Seoul, South Korea

Founding
In 1946, the church was founded by a refugee from North Korea, Rev. Kim Dong-chul.  He was martyred during the Korean War in 1950, in other words, during the capture of Seoul.  He refused to take refuge in the southern areas, and was killed by the Army of DPRK.

1950-70
Second Pastor Seo Keumchan served this church.

Present
For 70 years, this church has grown at the Central Business District, heart of Seoul with great  reformed church tradition and modern culture.
Right now, Rev. Lee Kyungwook serves this church as a Senior Pastor. 

Christian organizations established in 1946
Presbyterian churches in Seoul